Siepen is a German language habitational surname. Notable people with the name include:

 Marcus Siepen (born 1968), German guitarist
 Peter Siepen (born 1962), Swedish television presenter

German-language surnames
German toponymic surnames